Nikolai Nikolayevich Yuzhanin (born 14 October 1963 in Krasnodar) is a Russian professional football coach and a former player. He is an assistant manager with Kyrgyzstan national football team.

Club career
As a player, he made his debut in 1991 the Soviet Second League in for FC Khimik Belorechensk.

References

1963 births
Sportspeople from Krasnodar
Living people
Soviet footballers
Association football defenders
Russian football managers
FC Kuban Krasnodar managers
FC Chernomorets Novorossiysk managers
Russian Premier League managers
Russian expatriates in Latvia
FC Kuban Krasnodar players
FC Aktobe players
Russian expatriate football managers